William Hayes was an Irish politician and farmer. He was elected unopposed as a Sinn Féin Teachta Dála (TD) to the 2nd Dáil at the 1921 elections for the Limerick City–Limerick East constituency. He supported the Anglo-Irish Treaty and voted in favour of it. He was re-elected unopposed as a pro-Treaty Sinn Féin TD at the 1922 general election. He did not contest the 1923 general election.

References

Year of birth missing
Year of death missing
Early Sinn Féin TDs
Members of the 2nd Dáil
Members of the 3rd Dáil
Irish farmers
Politicians from County Limerick